Tvibåsen Valley is an ice-filled valley whose upper portion divides into two heads, lying between Svarthamaren Mountain and Cumulus Mountain in the Mühlig-Hofmann Mountains of Queen Maud Land. It was mapped from surveys and air photos by the Norwegian Antarctic Expedition (1956–60) and named Tvibåsen ("the double stall").

References

Valleys of Queen Maud Land
Princess Astrid Coast